Andrea Holíková (born 15 January 1968) is a former Czechoslovak tennis player. She comes from the family of successful hockey players – she is the daughter Jaroslav Holík, the elder sister of Bobby Holík, and the niece of Jiří Holík. Holíková is married to former hockey player František "Frank" Musil.

Holíková was a very successful junior player. In 1985, she won the Wimbledon Championships and reached the final of the US Open. In doubles, Holíková and Radka Zrubáková were the finalists of the French Open, but collected the US Open title. Holíková's professional career was by far less successful. Her highest ranking positions were World No. 67 in singles and World No. 99 in doubles. Her best result in Grand Slam tournaments was the doubles quarterfinals at the 1985 French Open. Holíková did, however, defeat two top ten players, Kathy Rinaldi and Brenda Schultz. At the Spanish Open qualifications in 1985, she defeated then 13-year–old Arantxa Sánchez Vicario, future World No. 1 player.

Holíková won two ITF Circuit titles, one in singles and one in doubles. She also reached two Virginia Slims doubles finals, but never triumphed. Holíková has not competed professionally since 1990. She played her last singles match at the Bausch and Lomb Championships in April 1990, losing to Silvia Farina Elia 6–4, 6–3.

Personal life 
Holíková is the daughter of former ice hockey player Jaroslav Holík, who won the bronze medal at the 1972 Winter Olympics. Her younger brother and paternal uncle also professionally played hockey — Bobby Holík won the gold medal at the 1990 World Championships, while Jiří Holík also professionally played hockey, who won silver medals at the 1968 and 1976 Winter Olympics, and bronze medals at the 1964 and 1972 Winter Olympics. Holíková is married to former professional ice hockey player František "Frank" Musil, who won the gold medal at the 1985 World Championships. They have three children.

Holikova's son, David, was drafted in the 2nd round of the 2011 entry draft by the Edmonton Oilers of the National Hockey League (NHL), and younger son Adam was drafted in the 4th round of the 2015 draft by the St. Louis Blues.

Senior career highlights
Upset Kathy Rinaldi and gained third round of 1985 at US OPEN. Won first tournament of 1985 and her first pro title at the USTA Circuit at Key Biscayne, Florida; beat Kris Kinney in the final; reached the semifinals in the doubles draw. Ranked in the top 10 in Czechoslovakia for two years. Has career wins over Kathy Rinaldi, Pam Casale, Ginny Purdy, Barbara Jordan, Petra Jauch-Delhees, and Lilian Drescher.  She was coached by Vladislav Savrda.

Career statistics

Virginia Slims doubles finals (0–2)

ITF Circuit singles finals (1–1)

ITF Circuit doubles finals (1–0)

Junior Grand Slam singles finals (1–1)

Junior Grand Slam doubles finals (1–1)

References

External links 
 
 
 

1968 births
Czech female tennis players
Czechoslovak female tennis players
Living people
Wimbledon junior champions
US Open (tennis) junior champions
Grand Slam (tennis) champions in girls' singles
Grand Slam (tennis) champions in girls' doubles
Tennis players from Prague